The New Jersey Highlands Water Protection and Planning Council (or Highlands Council for short) was created by the Highlands Water Protection and Planning Act in 2004 for the purpose of preserving the quality and quantity of the water resources of the New Jersey Highlands region.  It is allocated within the New Jersey Department of Environmental Protection but is independent of any supervision or control by the department or by the commissioner or any officer or employee thereof. The Highlands Council approved the Highlands Regional Master Plan at its meeting held July 17, 2008, and the plan became effective on September 8, 2008,  after the governor's review period.

External links

 Highlands Water Protection and Planning Council web site
 Highlands Water Protection and Planning Act of 2004

State agencies of New Jersey